Shaoling District is a district of the city of Luohe, Henan province, China.

Administrative divisions
As 2012, this district is divided to 2 subdistricts, 5 towns and 2 townships.
Subdistricts
Dizhuang Subdistrict
Tianqiaojie Subdistrict

Towns

Townships
Houxie Township
Qingniancun Township

References

External links
Official website of Shaoling District Government

County-level divisions of Henan
Luohe